Lukáš Killar (born 5 August 1981 in Opočno) is a former Czech footballer (defender). He is currently working as athletic supervisor for the Polish side Polonia Bytom.

External links
 
 

1981 births
Living people
Czech footballers
Czech First League players
FC Slovan Liberec players
SK Kladno players
Polonia Bytom players
Ekstraklasa players
Czech expatriate footballers
Czech expatriate sportspeople in Poland
Expatriate footballers in Poland
Association football defenders